Elections to the Congress of the Philippines was held on April 23, 1946. Voters elected the members of Congress in the following elections:
1946 Philippine Senate election for all 24 members of the Philippine Senate and
1946 Philippine House of Representatives elections for all of the members of the House of Representatives of the Philippines.

1946
1946 elections in the Philippines